Qeshlaq-e Qarah Daghlu (also Romanized as Qeshlāq-e Qarah Dāghlū) is a village in Qeshlaq Rural District, Abish Ahmad District, Kaleybar County, East Azerbaijan Province, Iran. At the 2006 census, its population was 455, in 82 families. The village is populated by the Kurdish Chalabianlu tribe.

References 

Populated places in Kaleybar County
Kurdish settlements in East Azerbaijan Province